The Passaic Preparatory Academy is a four-year public magnet middle /  high school in Passaic in Passaic County, New Jersey, United States, operated as part of the Passaic City School District and serving students in sixth through twelfth grades offered by the school district.

As of the 2021–22 school year, the school had an enrollment of 749 students and 57.0 classroom teachers (on an FTE basis), for a student–teacher ratio of 13.1:1. There were 749 students (100.0% of enrollment) eligible for free lunch and none eligible for reduced-cost lunch.

Administration
The school's principal is Stacey Bruce. Her core administration team includes two assistant principals.

References

External links 
School website
Passaic Public Schools

School Data for the Passaic Public Schools, National Center for Education Statistics

Education in Passaic County, New Jersey
Middle schools in New Jersey
Public high schools in Passaic County, New Jersey
Passaic, New Jersey